Street Beat is the debut album by The Deele.

Reception

Released in 1983 on the SOLAR Records label, which was distributed by Elektra/Asylum Records. It was produced by Midnight Star member Reggie Calloway. This album included The Deele's first big hit, "Body Talk," which reached #3 on the R&B chart.

Trivia
"Body Talk" was featured in the pilot episode for the television series Miami Vice.
There was also little known speculation that it was the "Answer" song The Time's 1982 single "The Walk", from which the song allegedly had drawn it's inspiration.

Track listing
"Body Talk"  (Watson, Greene, Reid, Gentry, Burke)  5:36
"I Surrender"  (B. Simmons, B. Lovelace, D. Bristol)  4:18
"Just My Luck"  (Kenny Edmonds)  4:30
"Sexy Love"  (K. Edmonds, A. Reid, S. Burke) 5:00
"Street Beat"  (Kenneth Gant, Reginald Calloway)  7:55
"Video Villain"  (Vincent Calloway, Reginald Calloway)  4:54
"Crazy 'Bout 'Cha"  (Watson, Greene, Cooper, K. Edmonds, A. Reid)  4:34
"Working (9 To 5)"  (Watson, Greene, Bristol, Robinson, Burke)  4:25

Personnel
"Carlos" Carl Greene: Main Vocal, Vocal Backing
"Dee" Darnell Bristol: Vocals
Kenny Edmonds: Guitars, Keyboards, Vocals
"Stick" Stanley Burke: Guitars, Vocals
Melvin Gentry: Guitars
Bill Simmons, Bo Watson, Vincent Calloway: Keyboards, Synthesizers
Kevin "Kayo" Robinson: Bass, Vocal Backing
"L.A." Reid: Drums, Percussion, Vocal Backing

Charts

Singles

References

External links
 The Deele-Street Beat  at Discogs

1983 debut albums
SOLAR Records albums
Elektra Records albums
Asylum Records albums
Babyface (musician) albums